Yoon Jin-young (born August 11, 1999), better known by his stage name Ash Island (stylized in all caps), formerly Clloud, is a South Korean rapper. He was a contestant on season 2 of Mnet's High School Rapper, where he finished in 4th place. He joined The Quiett's sub-label, Ambition Musik in November 2018. He released his debut album, Ash, on March 22, 2019.

Discography

Studio albums

Singles

Awards and nominations

References

1999 births
Living people
South Korean male rappers
South Korean hip hop singers
21st-century South Korean male singers